Geechie (and various other spellings, such as Geechy or Geechee) is a word referring to the U.S. Lowcountry ethnocultural group of the descendants of West African slaves who retained their cultural and linguistic history, otherwise known as the Gullah people and Gullah language (aka, Geechie Gullah, or Gullah-Geechee, etc). It has been used as a nickname for persons originating out of this culture and ethnic group. The term derives from the name of the Ogeechee River, an area where many of them settled.

People with this nickname
 Lillie Mae "Geechie" Boone Scott Wiley (1908–1950), country blues musician
 Julies J. "Geechie" Fields (1904–1997), jazz musician
 Norwood "Geechie" Johnson, funk musician, member of the band The Wild Magnolias
 Buford "Geechie" Meredith (1899–1932), Negro league baseball player
 James "Geechy" Robinson, a jazz musician, see List of nicknames of jazz musicians
 Johnnie "Geechie" Temple (1906–1968), blues musician
John " Geechie" Wilson, Raggae dancer 1800s
Geechi Gotti, West coast battle rap emcee and Nutty Blocc crip gang member*
Gilbert “Geechie Boi/GB” Frierson, University of Miami Football Player

Characters
 "Geechee" Beatrice, an Oscar-nominated role portrayed by Alfre Woodard from the 1983 film Cross Creek
 Dan "Geechie Dan" Beauford, a character portrayed by Harry Belafonte, in the 1974 film Uptown Saturday Night
 "Geechy" Joe, a character portrayed by Cab Calloway, in the 1943 film Stormy Weather

References

See also